Tipper Newton is an American actress and musician best known for her role as Karen in The Mindy Project and Sinnomin in The Guest Book.

Biography
Tipper Newton was born in Overland Park, Kansas and raised in Omaha, Nebraska. She graduated from Columbia College Chicago with a B.A. in film. On the side she performs with her power-pop band Color TV.

Newton had a recurring appearance as Karen, the girlfriend of Colette, on The Mindy Project. She made a guest appearance on Agents of S.H.I.E.L.D. as Roxy Glass in the episode "The Totally Excellent Adventures of Mack and The D".

Filmography

References

External links

21st-century American actresses
People from Omaha, Nebraska
Columbia College Chicago alumni